Team Kaylie is an American sitcom streaming television series created by Tracy Bitterolf and developed by Pamela Eells O'Connell, directed by Bob Koherr and starring Bryana Salaz and Alison Fernandez.

Netflix ordered 20 episodes of the series, 
5 episodes were released on September 23, 2019 on Netflix, with other 6 on December 2, 2019. The final 9 episodes were released on February 3, 2020.

Plot
Kaylie Konrad (Bryana Salaz) is a famous 19-year-old billionaire and reality TV show celebrity who gets into a car accident and is sentenced to one-year of community service leading a Wilderness Club at an inner city middle school.

Cast

Main
 Bryana Salaz as Kaylie Konrad
 Alison Fernandez as Amber
 Symera Jackson as Jackie
 Elie Samouhi as Chewy
 Kai Calhoun as Ray Ray
 Eliza Pryor as Valeria

Recurring
 Rosa Blasi as Kit Konrad
 David Gridley as Colt Axelrod 
 Nicole Sullivan as Principal Dana
 Scarlett Abinante as Kamantha Konrad

Episodes

Season 1 (2019-20)

Release
Team Kaylie was released on September 23, 2019 on Netflix.

References

External links

2010s American teen sitcoms
2020s American teen sitcoms
2019 American television series debuts
2020 American television series endings
English-language Netflix original programming
Television series about teenagers